The anterior vagal trunk is one of the two divisions (the other being the posterior vagal trunk) into which the vagus nerve splits as it passes through the esophageal hiatus to enter the abdominal cavity. The anterior and posterior vagal trunks represent the inferior continuation of the esophageal nervous plexus inferior to the diaphragm. The majority of nerve fibres in the anterior vagal trunk are derived from the left vagus nerve.

The anterior vagal trunk is responsible mainly for providing parasympathetic innervation to the lesser curvature of the stomach, pylorus, gallbladder, and biliary apparatus.

Anatomy

Branches 
 Hepatic branch which supply the liver, gallbladder, and biliary apparatus.
 Celiac branch which contributes parasympathetic afferents to the celiac plexus.
 Anterior gastric branches which supply the stomach.
 Anterior and posterior nerves of Latarjet which innervate the pylorus, and proximal duodenum.

Clinical significance 
The anterior vagal trunk and its branches are at risk of iatrogenic injury during surgeries of the distal oesophagus, stomach, proximal duodenum, gallbladder, and biliary tract.

See also
 Posterior vagal trunk

References

External links
 

Vagus nerve
Nerves of the torso